Le Morne-Vert is a village and commune in the French overseas department of Martinique.

See also
Communes of the Martinique department

References

External links

Communes of Martinique
Populated places in Martinique